Adriaantje Hollaer (1610 – 0, 1693) was a Netherlands woman known for her portrait by Rembrandt, currently in a private collection.

Hollaer was born in Rotterdam as the daughter of the merchant Pieter Jacobs Hollaer and Ingetje Rochusd. She married  Hendrik Martenszoon Sorgh on 20 February 1633. They had at least five children, and their son Maerten lived until 1702. Her portrait featured during the years 1947-1950 on the Dutch banknote for 100 guilders. 

Hollaer died in Rotterdam.

References

1610 births
1693 deaths
Models from Rotterdam